Prairie Township is one of seventeen townships in Kosciusko County, Indiana. As of the 2010 census, its population was 1,651 and it contained 671 housing units.

History
Prairie Township was organized in 1838 and named from its setting upon the prairie.

The Hall Farm was listed on the National Register of Historic Places in 1992.

Geography

Unincorporated towns
 Atwood at 
 Clunette at 
(This list is based on USGS data and may include former settlements.)

References

External links
 Indiana Township Association
 United Township Association of Indiana

Townships in Kosciusko County, Indiana
Townships in Indiana